Chiaretta Gelli (1925–2007) was an Italian singer and film actress. She was one of several young Italian actresses promoted as a star similar to the Hollywood-based Canadian Deanna Durbin.

Selected filmography
 Departure at Seven (1946)
 Il birichino di papà (1946)
 Hotel Luna, Room 34 (1946)

References

Bibliography 
 Gundle, Stephen. Mussolini's Dream Factory: Film Stardom in Fascist Italy. Berghahn Books, 2013.

External links 
 

1925 births
2007 deaths
Italian stage actresses
Italian film actresses
People from İzmir